Constantin Tărloiu (born 27 July 1960) is a Romanian sports shooter. He competed in two events at the 1996 Summer Olympics.

References

1960 births
Living people
Romanian male sport shooters
Olympic shooters of Romania
Shooters at the 1996 Summer Olympics
Sportspeople from Bucharest